Norman Gravell (15 July 1915 – 22 December 1978) was an Australian rules footballer who played with St Kilda in the Victorian Football League (VFL).

Notes

External links 

1915 births
1978 deaths
Australian rules footballers from Victoria (Australia)
St Kilda Football Club players
Prahran Football Club players